Philip Eric Rene Jansen (born January 1967) is a British businessman, the chief executive officer (CEO) of BT since February 2019, having been CEO of Worldpay since April 2013.

Early life
Jansen has a bachelor's degree in economics from University College Cardiff.

Career
In 2010, Jansen joined Brakes Group as CEO, having been COO of Sodexo.

Following the Worldpay IPO in 2015 by its then private equity owners, Bain Capital and Advent International, Jansen was due to receive £50 million.

On 19 September 2018, Worldpay announced that Jansen would step down at the end of the year.

On 25 October 2018 he was announced as the new CEO of BT with effect from 1 February 2019, succeeding Gavin Patterson.

During his tenure as CEO of BT Group, an industrial dispute began with the CWU due to pay and working conditions. This led to a strike ballot where 91.5% of BT, 95.8% of Openreach and 95.5% of EE CWU members who took part in the ballot voted to strike. During the dispute, some employees and commentators referred to him as “Foodbank Phil”.

Personal life
Jansen is married, with five children, and lives in west London. In March 2020, Jansen tested positive for coronavirus. He stated he would self-isolate per health official recommendations. Jansen self-isolated alongside his wife and three of their children.

References

1967 births
Living people
Alumni of Cardiff University
British chief executives
British Telecom people